Ana Catarina Nogueira (born 20 September 1978) is a Portuguese professional padel player and former international tennis player.

Biography
Born in Porto, Nogueira holds the Portugal Fed Cup record for most ties played and is the most successful doubles player in the team's history. She featured in 36 ties between 1997 and 2008, winning 22 matches, 16 of which came in doubles.

Nogueira won three ITF singles titles and had a best ranking of 383 in the world. Most of her WTA Tour main-draw appearances came in her home country's events, including the Estoril Open where she played in the singles main draw as a wild card on four occasions.

She now competes on the World Padel Tour and in 2018 became the first Portuguese player to win a tournament.

ITF finals

Singles (3–3)

Doubles (3–3)

References

External links
 
 
 
 

1978 births
Living people
Portuguese female tennis players
Female tennis players playing padel
Sportspeople from Porto
21st-century Portuguese women